Erasmus Hall High School was a four-year public high school located at 899–925 Flatbush Avenue between Church and Snyder Avenues in the Flatbush neighborhood of the New York City borough of Brooklyn. It was founded in 1786 as Erasmus Hall Academy, a private institution of higher learning named for the scholar Desiderius Erasmus, known as Erasmus of Rotterdam, a Dutch Renaissance humanist and Catholic Christian theologian. The school was the first secondary school chartered by the New York State Regents. The clapboard-sided, Georgian-Federal-style building, constructed on land donated by the Flatbush Reformed Dutch Church, was turned over to the public school system in 1896.

Around the start of the 20th century, Brooklyn experienced a rapidly growing population, and the original small school was enlarged with the addition of several wings and the purchase of several nearby buildings. In 1904, the Board of Education began a new building campaign to meet the needs of the burgeoning student population. The Superintendent of School Buildings, architect C. B. J. Snyder, designed a series of buildings to be constructed as needed, around an open quadrangle, while continuing to use the old building in the center of the courtyard. The original Academy building, which still stands in the courtyard of the current school, served the students of Erasmus Hall in three different centuries. Now a designated New York City Landmark and listed in the National Register of Historic Places, the building is a museum exhibiting the school's history.

Due to poor academic scores, the city closed Erasmus Hall High School in 1994, turning the building into Erasmus Hall Educational Campus and using it as the location for five separate small schools.

History

Erasmus Hall Academy
Erasmus Hall Academy was founded as a private school by Reverend John H. Livingston and Senator John Vanderbilt in 1786 and became the first secondary school chartered by the New York State Board of Regents. Land was donated by the Flatbush Dutch Reformed Church for the building and contributions were collected for “an institution of higher learning,” from leading citizens such as Aaron Burr, Alexander Hamilton, Peter Lefferts and Robert Livingston.

The wood-framed, clapboard-sided, Georgian and Federal style school building, two and one-half stories tall with hipped roof, was opened in 1787 with 26 students. Through the years, various wings were added to the Academy building and later removed.

Erasmus Hall Academy began accepting female students in 1801, and in 1803 it incorporated the village school of Flatbush. The village evolved into a city, and started a public school system that competed with Erasmus for its student body. As a result, there was a steady decline in its enrollment until in 1896 enrollment was reduced to 150 boys and girls, up from the 105 boys who were registered in the school in 1795. The Board of Trustees decided to donate the Academy to the public school system with the following resolution by the Board of Trustees:

That the Board of Trustees offer the grounds of the Academy to the Board of Education of the City of Brooklyn upon the following conditions, viz: In consideration of the gift of the land the Board of Education are to erect and maintain upon said land a High School Building of the same character and grade as other High School Buildings in the City of Brooklyn.

Erasmus Hall High School

Following the agreement with the Erasmus Hall Board of Trustees, the Board of Education of the City of Brooklyn requested proposals for a design for a new school building. Twenty architects responded with plans, several of which were published in contemporary architectural periodicals.

It soon became clear that none of these plans could be erected for less than a million dollars, and since that was considered too expensive, the project was dropped. The Brooklyn Board of Education did however, approve "temporary additions" to the school to accommodate the growing population and purchased additional property to allow more room to build a new school.

With the consolidation of the City of New York in 1898, the highly varied needs of schools in all the boroughs came under the purview of the New York City school board. This board had to cope with a sizable number of independently administered school districts, each with its own curricula, grade divisions, educational policies, and standards, and weld them all into a single, uniform educational system. At the same time, New York City was experiencing a huge influx of immigrants (increasing the school registers between 1900 and 1904 by 132,000 pupils), and the schools were expected to help Americanize these new students. New high schools were needed in all the boroughs and the Board of Education authorized large new buildings for Morris High School in the Bronx,  DeWitt Clinton High School in The Bronx,  Curtis High School in Staten Island,  Flushing High School in Queens, and Erasmus Hall High School in Brooklyn.

In the interim, however, before a new building for Erasmus Hall could be constructed, the Board of Education purchased more land along Bedford Avenue near the existing building, and established classrooms in the expansion buildings that were already on the lot. They also used classrooms in other schools, such as P.S. 977, and held half-day classes.

The modern high school was designed in the Collegiate Gothic style that Snyder used on many of his buildings.

On August 17, 1904, the New York City School Board's Committee on Buildings presented its plans for a new campus for Erasmus Hall High School. It was designed to be constructed around the existing, centrally-located buildings, so that classes could continue to be held there until the new buildings were ready. The plan called for a full quadrangle of buildings along the perimeter of the large lot. It was constructed during four periods: 1905-1906, 1909-1911, 1924-1925, and 1939-1940, with the two later buildings supervised by William H. Gompert and Eric Kebbon, respectively. Its buff brick facades have limestone and  terra cotta trim and feature central entrance towers with Oriel windows and crenellated parapets, Tudor-arched entrances, label moldings, and large window groupings. The style of Erasmus Hall evolved over the years so that the most recent buildings are simpler, with less ornamentation, but retain the general characteristics of the earlier ones, giving a sense of unity to the entire composition. The first buildings would be constructed along Flatbush Avenue, with others added over time, as the need became clear and funds became available.

Phase One
Snyder explained his plans for the first phase as follows:

... A careful study of the matter convinced me that after all it was a good thing for the future of the school that the present one could not be disturbed, for therein lay the suggestion for a design unique in high schools of the country... A quadrangle enclosed by buildings devoted to various departments of school work.

The buildings, therefore, have been designed as a screen across the end of the quadrangle, shutting out the noise and confusion of Flatbush Avenue traffic, the only entrance being through the large arch under the tower, which is placed on the axis of the longer dimension of the plot.

This, as designed, would be called a chapel were it part of a college, but if we may not aspire to this, yet I have thought that it might be known as ‘the Hall.’ As such the endeavor has been to design a harmonious, impressive room, in a style permeated with history and romance; a place which, of all others, will stand out clearly in the loving memory of the student in after years for his alma mater. Its walls, columns and arches should bear the trophies won in athletic and scholastic contests, there to be preserved and handed down as part of the glorious history of the school.He regretted that a gymnasium could not be included in the first part of the building, but he had “the expectation that a proper gymnasium building will be erected in the near future as one of the new group...”. He also admitted that, at that time,

There have been no designs made for this elevation (Bedford Avenue), but the aim has been to have a central tower on the same axis as that on Flatbush Avenue, through the archway in the base of which will be afforded a view of the ‘quad’ with its greensward, trees, shrubs and vines. What the ultimate design of the various buildings going to make up the group may be, it is, of course, impossible to say, but in designing and planning that portion which you now see approaching completion, I have always intended that the whole should be a graphic illustration of the various phases of the so-called Gothic movement, from the Round Arch to the Flamboyant and on through its later transitional stage.

The Committee on Buildings described the first section, estimated to cost not more than $300,000, this way:

It consists of an entrance tower which will be the center of what will afterwards be the completed front on Flatbush avenue; to the left of the tower and connected therewith has been placed the building in the rear portion of which will be the auditorium, classrooms, library, etc. The building will be three and four stories in height.

The basement will contain the gymnasium, placed beneath the auditorium, lecture rooms, baths, toilet room, etc., the boiler or power room being placed beneath the driveway of the tower, one of the turrets of which is utilized for a smoke flue.

The first floor will contain the offices of the principal of the school, two classrooms and the auditorium.

The second story will contain a library  square with a gallery facing the second story of the tower, the balance of the floor being apportioned to the gallery of the auditorium, four classrooms, teacher's rooms, toilets, etc.

The third floor will contain four classrooms, demonstration room, balance room, chemical laboratory, and lecture room.

The fourth story, which is over a portion of the building, will contain four classrooms. The completed scheme of which this is only a part contemplates the erection of a building on the northerly side of the tower for additional classrooms and laboratories, etc., as may be needed in the future.

The cornerstone for the new building was laid in January 1905 and work was begun immediately, resulting in seating for an additional 600 students. The construction contract was initially supposed to run until October 1905, but revisions required by the school board for laboratories and classrooms necessitated changes in the electrical and sanitation plans and delayed the work. The building was opened to students in September 1906.

In 1906, the committee purchased a real estate lot that was 57' 10" X 138' 9" X 359' 3" X 7' 3" X 493' 6" “adjoining Erasmus Hall High School... to permit carrying out of the scheme for a building commanding a quadrangle, and will be built upon as soon as the school is in need of additional accommodations.

Phase Two

Although the first section of the new building brought the total students accommodated in 1906 to 1,750, by 1907 Erasmus Hall was again overcrowded, requiring the use of an annex at P.S. 42.

In his annual report, the Superintendent of Schools declared that,

The largest growth in high schools is found in Brooklyn. This growth arises not only from the natural increase in the number of pupils entering from the Brooklyn elementary schools, but also from the number of pupils entering from the Manhattan elementary schools ...The consequence is that the Brooklyn high schools are all crowded to excess.

Concerned citizens of the area wrote to the Board of Education emphasizing:

... the fact that the new building contains only twelve classrooms, accommodating only 420 pupils, whereas there are fifty-two classes, comprising 1,591 pupils, occupying classrooms in the old frame school building and cottages, all of which are utterly unfit for use.

The Superintendent's Annual Report for 1910 reported that 3,114 pupils were enrolled at Erasmus Hall High School and that they were accommodated in four different annex buildings in addition to the main one.

In 1909, the Board of Education approved Snyder's plans for the next section of the school. This group of three buildings, including one to the north of the tower facing Flatbush Avenue, and two extending east along the northern side of the lot, comprised 31 classrooms, laboratories, study hall, music, drawing, physics, lecture and shop rooms. When this Church Avenue addition opened in September 1911, there was room for 1,451 more students in the main school.

Phase Three

The ever-growing school population continued to present challenges to the school board. In his report of May 21, 1924 on construction and maintenance, the Superintendent of Schools discussed "the stupendous building program now being carried on by the Board of Education..." The reason for this situation was given as a backlog of not enough building over several years, as well as an increase in high school population in New York City from 20,948 students in 1904, to 109,370 in 1924. These large numbers were attributed to many factors, including the passage and enforcement of a compulsory education law and the appreciation by more parents of the advantages of higher education to their children. In April 1924, the Board of Education approved the Bedford Avenue addition to Erasmus Hall High School. Snyder had left his position with the Board of Education shortly before construction of this section, but an elevation drawing in the collection of the Art Commission, by C. B. J. Snyder shows the building essentially as built. William Gompert had been appointed in his place and supervised the construction. Although somewhat simpler than his earlier buildings, the Bedford building has a central tower with an arched passageway into the courtyard, on axis with the tower on Flatbush Avenue. The building contained many new classrooms, gymnasia and a large swimming pool along the courtyard and was opened on February 2, 1902.

A statue of Erasmus, cast from the 1622 original in Rotterdam by Hendrick de Keyser and donated by Richard Young, an alumnus of the school, was installed in the school's courtyard. Dedicated in 1931, the base is engraved with the words: Desiderius Erasmus, the maintainer and restorer of the sciences and polite literature, the greatest man of his century, the excellent citizen who, through his immortal writings, acquired an everlasting fame.

Phase Four

Lobbying began in 1929 for the construction of the final section, the building on the south side of the lot connecting the Bedford Avenue building with the auditorium near Flatbush Avenue. Money was not appropriated for this until 1937, and it was finally built in 1939–40. Under the supervision of the school system's then chief architect, Eric Kebbon, the five-story building was an even more simplified version of Snyder's earlier work. It contained many classrooms, art and homemaking rooms, a girls’ gym and a large library, and could accommodate 1,566 additional pupils. The new section opened in September 1940. To construct this building, the original frame school house had to be moved and its several wings demolished. Work on the old structure was begun by the Works Progress Administration, but was halted due to the outbreak of World War II. After the war, the relocation and restoration of the old building was completed and it was used for administrative offices.

In 1987, in celebration of the school's bicentennial, limited archaeological excavations were conducted under the auspices of Brooklyn College. The archaeologists discovered that intact deposits from the 18th and 19th centuries associated with the development of the school are still in place.

Closure and current status

In 1994, after years of poor academic scores, the huge Erasmus Hall High School was divided internally into five smaller high schools, each concentrating on a different academic area. The five schools have separate administrations and faculties, and hold classes in different sections of the large building. However, they use the common lunchroom, gymnasium, library and auditorium at separate times during the day. This division created no changes on the exterior of the building.

As of 2010, separate high schools now operate on the Erasmus Hall Educational Campus:
 Academy for College Preparation and Career Exploration: A College Board School (K382)
 Academy of Hospitality and Tourism (K408)
 High School for Service & Learning at Erasmus (K539)
 High School for Youth and Community Development at Erasmus (K537)
 Science, Technology and Research Early College High School/Middle School at Erasmus (K543)

Restorations
In 2011, the columns that supported the building were found to have structural problems, and that year, the building received a restoration. A 2019 report states that "the building still needs more love but in 2017 Brooklyn Borough President Eric Adams pledged $650,000 of the capital budget for exterior restoration".

Notable alumni

Erasmus Hall has had a number of famous and accomplished alumni (and some who are mistakenly believed to have attended, such as Barbara Stanwyck). Some of the better known, including (class year), are listed below.

Pre-20th century
Suzanne Kaaren (1904-2007); Actress.

 John M. Berrien (1793); Attorney General of the United States and Senator.
 George Hall; first mayor of Brooklyn.
 John W. Hunter (1824); New York State Senator, Congressman, and mayor of Brooklyn.
 Morris Smith Miller (1794); Congressman and First Judge of Oneida County.
 George M. Troup (1792); Governor of Georgia.

20th century

 Rebecca Alpert (born 1950), professor of Jewish American religious history who was one of the first congregational women rabbis
 Mary Anderson, silent film actress
Ira N. Levine, author and professor of Chemistry at Brooklyn College
 Irving Anker (1911–2000), educator and administrator
 Herbert Aptheker (1915–2003), Marxist historian, Communist and political activist
 Bob Arum, boxing promoter.
 David Attie, photographer, who later shot portraits of fellow Erasmus Hall alumnus Bobby Fischer
 Tony Balsamo (1931), Major League Baseball pitcher for the Chicago Cubs
 Joseph Barbera (1928); artist; cartoonist; co-founder of Hanna-Barbera.
 Sylvan Barnet (1926–2016), literary critic and Shakespearean scholar
 Jeff Barry (Joel Adelberg) (1955); songwriter/producer; Songwriters Hall of Fame member
 Louis Begley (born 1933), Polish-born American novelist
 Randy E. Bennett, educational researcher
 Barbara Berman (born 1938); represented New Jersey's 6th legislative district for a single term
 Karen Bernod, singer
 Miriam Bienstock (1923–2015), record company executive
 Morton Birnbaum (1926–2005), lawyer and physician
 Julius Blank (1925–2011), semiconductor pioneer
 Clara Bow, silent film actress
 Oscar Brand (1920–2016), Canadian-born American folk singer-songwriter and author
 Alvin Bronstein (1928–2015), lawyer, founder and Director Emeritus of the National Prison Project of the American Civil Liberties Union Foundation
 Carol Bruce, actress and singer
 Phillip Brutus, Florida politician
 Artie Butler, music arranger and songwriter
 Miriam Goldman Cedarbaum, Senior Judge of the United States District Court for the Southern District of New York
 Theodore Caplow (1920–2015); sociologist, author, founder of the Department of Sociology at the University of Virginia
 Jeff Chandler (Ira Grossel) (1935); actor
 Andrew Cheshire (1981); artist/musician
 Hy Cohen, Major League Baseball player
 Karl P. Cohen (1913–2012), physical chemist who became a mathematical physicist
 Steven M. Cohen (born 1950), sociologist
 Al Cohn, tenor saxophonist
 Betty Comden (1933); playwright; Broadway musical songwriter with Adolph Green.
 Jane Cowl (1902); actress, playwright (original name Grace Bailey).
 Billy Cunningham (1961); player and coach, Philadelphia '76ers basketball team.
 Jon Cypher (1949); actor (Hill Street Blues)
 George Dargo (1953), professor at New England Law Boston
 Al Davis; Oakland Raiders owner, Pro Football Hall of Fame member.
 Clive Davis (1949); Grammy Award winning record producer; Chairman & CEO BMG North America; founder of Arista Records
 Neil Diamond, attended Erasmus from 1954–56; singer/songwriter.
 Will Downing (1981); singer
 Mort Drucker (born 1929), caricaturist and comics artist
 Norm Drucker, professional basketball official
 Donald Dubin (1933-2022) Founding member Microbiology Dept, Rutgers Medical School; research in antimicrobial resistance, RNA modification, and AIDS transmission.
 Genevieve Earle (1885–1956); first woman elected to the New York City Council, in 1937
 Bobby Fischer (dropped out in 1960); chess champion.
 Jim Florio (1964); former Governor of New Jersey.
 Joseph C. H. Flynn; lawyer, politician, and magistrate
 Robert Peter Gale (1962); physician, biomedical scientist and author
 Dave Getz (1957); drummer Big Brother and the Holding Company
 Theresa Goell, archaeologist
Jeffrey P. Gold, MD, cardiac surgeon and Chancellor, University of Nebraska Medical Center
 Jonah Goldman, major league baseball player
 Deborah Grabien (c. 1971); novelist/essayist; musician and songwriter.
 Earl G. Graves (1952); publisher of Black Enterprise magazine
 Clement Greenberg (1909–1994), essayist
 William Lindsay Gresham (1909–1962), novelist and non-fiction author
 Arno Gruen, psychoanalyst, psychologist and writer
 Susan Hayward (Edythe Marrenner), (1935); Oscar-winning actress
 Mel Holder (1978), Grammy-nominated saxophonist/songwriter/author/pastor
 Eleanor Holm (1932); Olympic swimmer
 Mikhail Horowitz (born 1950), poet, parodist, satirist, social commentator, author and editor.
 Moe Howard (Moses Harry Horwitz), (dropped out after two months, 1915) member of the Three Stooges comedy team
 Waite Hoyt, Baseball Hall of Fame pitcher for the New York Yankees and long-time broadcaster for the Cincinnati Reds
 Stanley Edgar Hyman; literary critic; husband of Shirley Jackson.
 Marty Ingels, comedian; husband of Shirley Jones.
 Ned Irish (1924); organizer of first Madison Square Garden basketball tournament (1934); founder of the New York Knicks; president, Madison Square Garden; member of the Basketball Hall of Fame.
 Brian Jackson; pianist, flautist and songwriter who wrote and performed with Gil Scott Heron and the Midnight Band throughout the 1970s
 Roger Kahn (1945); sportswriter, author of several books including The Boys of Summer.
 Tom Kahn (1956); leader of the civil rights, social-democratic, and labor movements.
 Eric Kandel (1944); winner of Nobel Prize for Medicine or Physiology, 2000.
 Lainie Kazan (Lainie Levine), (1956); actress and singer
 Dorothy Kilgallen (1930); newspaper journalist, television game show panelist and talk radio personality
 Elaine de Kooning (1918–1989), Abstract Expressionist and Figurative Expressionist painter
 Bernie Kopell (1953); actor
 Harold Kushner (1951); rabbi and author.
 Arthur Laurents (1917–2011), playwright, stage director and screenwriter
 Daniel Lang, author and journalist
 Dr. Mabel Ping-Hua Lee (1896-1966); well-known figure in the women's suffrage movement, first Chinese woman in the United States to earn a PhD in Economics, established the First Chinese Baptist Church and the Chinese Community Center
 Samuel LeFrak (1936); real estate developer.
 Larry Levan, DJ
 Abraham Lilienfeld, epidemiologist and professor
 Sid Luckman (1935); football champion with the Chicago Bears; NFL quarterback and Pro Football Hall of Fame.
 Bernard Malamud (1932); author and educator; Pulitzer Prize for The Magic Barrel, 1958 and The Fixer, 1967
 Daniel Mann, attended in 1920s, transferred before graduating; film and television director.
 Kedar Massenburg (1981); former CEO/President of Motown Records
 Barbara McClintock (1919); winner of Nobel Prize for Physiology or Medicine, 1983.
Joseph McGoldrick (1901–1978) - NYC Comptroller and NY State Residential Rent Control Commissioner, lawyer, and professor
 Aline MacMahon, actress
 Don McMahon, Major League Baseball player
 James Meissner (1914); World War I Flying Ace
 Stephanie Mills, (1975); actress/singer.
 Doug Moe, (1956); long time player and coach, ABA and NBA.
 Don Most (1970); actor
 Jay Neugeboren (born 1938), novelist, essayist, and short story writer
 Matthew Nimetz (born 1939), diplomat
 Bob Olin; boxer and world light heavyweight champion
 William E. Paul (1936–2015), immunologist
 Lee Pockriss (1924–2011), songwriter
 Gilbert Price (1960); singer/actor. Protege of Langston Hughes.
 Marky Ramone (Marc Steven Bell), drummer of seminal New York punk band The Ramones
 Michael Rapaport, TV actor, attended Erasmus in the 1980s
 Eleanor Raskin (née Stein; born 1946), member of the Weatherman, adjunct instructor at Albany Law School
 Lynn Pressman Raymond (–2009), toy and game innovator who was president of the Pressman Toy Corporation
 Jerry Reinsdorf (1953); part-owner of the Chicago Bulls and Chicago White Sox.
 Wayne Rhoden, attended Erasmus in 1981; music producer, singer, songwriter, sound engineer and video editor/director professionally known as the artist Father Goose Music
 Mike Rosen (1960) Denver radio talk show host
 Robert Rosen (1970); author of the best-selling biography Nowhere Man: The Final Days of John Lennon.
 Alvin Roth (1948); college basketball player
 Arlene Rothlein, postmodern dancer/choreographer and actress
 Lewis Rowland, neurologist, president of the American Neurological Association and the American Academy of Neurology
 Sam Rutigliano, former NFL head coach.
 Arthur M. Sackler, MD (1931); pharmaceutical executive and art collector.
 David Salzman (1961); American television producer and businessman.
 Guy Sands-Pingot, (1974); U.S. Army brigadier general
 Harvey Schiller, sports executive.
 Sheldon Segal, contraceptive developer.
 Alan Shulman (attended between 1928–1929); composer and cellist
 Beverly Sills (Belle Miriam Silverman), coloratura opera singer, attended Erasmus in the mid-1940s and transferred before graduating.
 Robert Silverberg (1952); novelist.
 Harold Snyder (1922–2008), businessperson who started Biocraft Laboratories
 Special Ed (Edward Archer), rapper who mentions Erasmus Hall on his album Youngest in Charge.
 Melodee M. Spevack (1970); actress, writer, anime voice performer
 Mickey Spillane (Morrison Spillane) (1936); author of detective and mystery fiction.
 Bern Nadette Stanis (Bernadette Stanislaus) (1972); actress
 Barbra Streisand (Barbara Joan Streisand) (1959); actress, singer, director, producer. 
 Simon H. Stertzer, professor emeritus at Stanford University, cardiologist; performed the first coronary angioplasty in the United States
 Charles ("Chuck") Suber (1937); publisher of DownBeat Magazine
 Paul Sylbert (1946), art director and set designer
 Richard Sylbert (1946) Academy Award-winning art director and set designer, twin brother of Paul
 Norma Talmadge (1911); silent film actress.
 Verree Teasdale (1903–1987) actress of stage and screen.
 Adrianne Tolsch comedian.
 Cheryl Toussaint (1970); athlete; Olympic gold medalist, 1972.
 D. Train (James Williams) (1980), singer/songwriter
 Kenny Vance, musician, who calls out Erasmus Hall in the first line of "Looking for an Echo"
 Eli Wallach, (1932); actor
 A. J. Weberman, (1959); inventor of the words "garbology" and "Dylanology"
 Sonny Werblin (1910–1991), entertainment industry executive and sports impresario, owner of the New York Jets, chairman of Madison Square Garden
 Mae West (Mary Jane West) (1911); actress, comedian, playwright.
 Anne Elizabeth Wilson writer, poet, editor; pet cemetery owner
 Marian Winters, actress.
 Paula Wolfert (1955), award-winning cookbook author and Mediterranean cuisines specialist

21st century

 Curtis Samuel (2013); professional football wide receiver for the Washington Commanders of the National Football League

See also

 List of New York City Landmarks
 National Register of Historic Places listings in Kings County, New York

References
Notes

Sources
 Landmarks Preservation Commission June 6, 2003
 Much of the information about the original school comes from the historical reviews compiled on significant anniversaries of the school for the three issues of The Chronicles of Erasmus Hall High School, 1906, 1906–1937, and 1937–1987 (New York: New York City Board of Education, 1906, 1937, 1987); National Register nomination form for Erasmus Hall Museum, prepared by Betty Ezequelle and Stephen Lash, 1973; and Marian Miller, “Erasmus Hall H.S. Boasts Proud History,'''” Kings Courier'' (5/31/1976),101, and New York City Guide, (New York: Octagon Books, 1970, reprint of 1939 Federal Writers Publication), 493–4.

External links

 Alumni website
 Alumni website (archive)
 Harriet Oxman Papers at the New-York Historical Society.
 Erasmus Hall Records at the New-York Historical Society.

School buildings on the National Register of Historic Places in New York City
Federal architecture in New York City
School buildings completed in 1787
Works Progress Administration in New York City
New York City Designated Landmarks in Brooklyn
Defunct high schools in Brooklyn
Flatbush, Brooklyn
1787 establishments in New York (state)
National Register of Historic Places in Brooklyn
Public high schools in Brooklyn